is a football (soccer) club based in Obihiro, which is located in Hokkaido in Japan. They play in the Hokkaido Soccer League, which is part of Japanese Regional Leagues.

History
Born in 1995 as Rude Boys, the club rapidly found promotions from Obihiro League to Prefectural Leagues. In 2006, a new name was established with Fair Sky FC, which was also promoted for the first time in the Hokkaido Soccer League. The name of the club did not stay the same; it became the Tokachi Fairsky FC in 2014 and Tokachi FC in 2017.

Beside the two victories in the Hokkaido Soccer League between 2014 and 2017, the most important change came with the last denomination change: Tokachi Football Club found a partnership with Leifras, a Japanese company.  The goal was to reach the Japan Football League and eventually professional football. The club's name was again changed for 2018, passing to Hokkaido Tokachi Sky Earth.

League record

Honours
 Hokkaido Soccer League 
Champions (5): 2014, 2017, 2018, 2019, 2020

Players

Current squad
.

Stadiums

References

External links
Official Facebook Page 
Official Twitter account 

Football clubs in Japan
Sports teams in Hokkaido
Association football clubs established in 1995
1995 establishments in Japan
Obihiro, Hokkaido